Profiat (or Profag) was a name used by Jews in Provence and northern Spain. In modern times the name has been transcribed as Peripoth, Peripetus, Periphot, Prifoth, Prevot, Parfait, Pourpeth, Peripedes, and Prophiat. In combination with "En" (meaning "Senior") the name occurs as "Enprofiat".

According to Buxtorf, Saenger, and Neubauer, "Profiat" is derived from the Latin "Profeta," and is a translation of the Hebrew "navi", an epithet occasionally used in connection with learned rabbis. The word "navi," however, never occurs as a proper name in Hebrew documents, and the explanation is, therefore, doubtful.

Isaac Bloch and Heinrich Gross hold that the proper pronunciation of the name is "profet." The name is the same as Barfat, both originating in the Provençal "Perfetto."

People with the given name Profiat
 Jacob ben Machir ibn Tibbon, also known as Prophatius
 Profiat Duran

References
 

Jewish masculine given names
French masculine given names
Spanish masculine given names